Haldia port   or Haldia Dock Complex has been built at the meeting place of the Haldi River and Hooghly river. Kolkata Port Trust has been created in this port as the port's partner. So it is not a  port. It is an official dock complex.

It has a vast hinterland comprising the entire north east of India including West Bengal, Bihar, Jharkhand, Uttar Pradesh, Madhya Pradesh, Assam, North East Hill States and two landlocked neighbouring countries namely, Nepal and Bhutan and also the Autonomous Region of Tibet (China).

With the turn of the century the volume of throughput has again started increasing steadily.

Geography

Location 
Haldia port is 8 meters above sea level and is located at 21.20 north and 88.00 east.

Dock system
It is situated at 22°02′N 88°06′E around 60 kilometres (37 mi) away from the pilotage station. The  port consists of:

 Impounded dock; system with 12 berths
 3 oil jetties in the river
 3 barge jetties in the river for handling oil carried by barges
 Haldia anchorage for lash vessels

The docks are impounded dock systems with locks from river.

Imports and exports
The port's main imports are petroleum, chemicals, and parts. Exports include coal, iron ore, and steel.  33 million tons of cargo were in the port 2014-2015.

See also
 Port of Kolkata
 Ports in West Bengal

References

External links

Ports and harbours of West Bengal
Transport in Haldia